Fernando Gastón Córdoba (born 12 June 1974) is a retired Argentine football midfielder. Córdoba started his career at Estudiantes de La Plata at the age of 19 before moving to Racing Club where he helped the team reach the semifinal stage of the Copa Libertadores. He had a brief stint in Italian football by playing for Sampdoria in the 1998–99 season. Afterwards Córdoba played for Colón de Santa Fe, Sporting Cristal, Olimpia, Quilmes and Club Atlético Belgrano.

While playing for Olimpia he became a fan favorite after scoring a goal in the final of the 2002 Copa Libertadores which was eventually won by Olimpia.

Titles
Olimpia
 Copa Libertadores: 2002
 Recopa Sudamericana: 2003

References

External links
 Gaston Cordoba Career
 Un Adios Temprano

1974 births
Living people
Association football midfielders
Argentine footballers
Estudiantes de La Plata footballers
Racing Club de Avellaneda footballers
U.C. Sampdoria players
Club Atlético Colón footballers
Sporting Cristal footballers
Club Olimpia footballers
Quilmes Atlético Club footballers
Club Atlético Belgrano footballers
Serie A players
Expatriate footballers in Italy
Expatriate footballers in Paraguay
Expatriate footballers in Peru
Argentine expatriate footballers
Argentine expatriate sportspeople in Italy
People from San Nicolás de los Arroyos
Sportspeople from Buenos Aires Province